Shariat Kola-ye Karim Kola (also Romanized as Sharī‘at Kolā-ye Karīm Kolā) is a village in Karipey Rural District, Lalehabad District, Babol County, Mazandaran Province, Iran. At the 2006 census, its population was 382, in 96 families.

References 

Populated places in Babol County